Oslo Nye Sparebank was a savings bank based in Oslo, Norway. It was established by Bondeungdomslaget i Oslo in 1921, which bought half the primary capital certificates. The bank had Nynorsk as it language of business. It was bought by Vestlandsbanken, a Bergen-based Nynorsk-bank, in 1975, for 1.1 million Norwegian krone. The sales price was transferred to Oslo Nye Sparebanks Fond, a charitable foundation which grants money to Nynorsk-based activities in the Oslo area.

References

Defunct banks of Norway
Nynorsk
Companies based in Oslo
Banks established in 1921
Banks disestablished in 1975
Norwegian companies established in 1921
1975 disestablishments in Norway